"At Your Command" is a 1931 song recorded by Bing Crosby on June 24, 1931 with piano accompaniment by Harry Barris.  The lyrics were written by Bing Crosby and Harry Tobias, The music was composed by Harry Barris.

The song was released as a Brunswick Records 78 single and the recording reached no. 1 on the pop singles charts for three weeks in the U.S., with a chart run of nine weeks. The song was published by Robbins Music Corporation in New York.

Bing Crosby sang "At Your Command" in the 1931 Mack Sennett two-reeler movie short I Surrender Dear.

The song has appeared on the following Bing Crosby albums:

 The Voice of Bing in the 30s, Brunswick, 1959
 No. 1 Hits & Million Sellers, Castle Pie, 2002 
 All the Number-One Hits, Goldies, 2002
 Swinging on a Star: His Fifty Greatest Hits of the 30s & 40s, ASV/Living Era, 2003
 Gold, Geffen, 2008

References

Sources
Grudens, Richard (2002). Bing Crosby – Crooner of the Century. Celebrity Profiles Publishing Co.. .
Macfarlane, Malcolm. Bing Crosby – Day By Day. Scarecrow Press, 2001.
Osterholm, J. Roger. Bing Crosby: A Bio-Bibliography. Greenwood Press, 1994.

1931 songs
Bing Crosby songs
Songs with lyrics by Harry Tobias
Songs with music by Harry Barris